Lars Ingvar Hirdwall (born 5 December 1934), is a Swedish actor. One of the country's most prolific stage and film actors, he is probably most widely recognised for his two heterogenous roles in the Martin Beck universe; as the eponymous killer in Bo Widerberg's The Man on the Roof in 1976, and the recurrent role as "The Neighbor" in the mass produced film series, a rambunctious raconteur who frequently interacts with the titular police investigator for the purpose of comic relief. He also had a role in the film adaption of Stieg Larsson's Millennium series as the lawyer Dirch Frode, and starred as various colourful characters in Lars Molin's comedies.

Hirdwall was born in Stockholm, and was educated at Gothenburg City Theatre stage school 1957-1960. Since the early 1960s he has been active as an actor in many films and TV series and on theatrical stages, mainly Stockholms stadsteater. He is well known in Sweden, often portraying obstinate or strange characters, like the eccentric neighbor in the many Swedish Martin Beck TV-movies made from 1997 on. He was also often in director Lars Molin's productions. In December 1993, Hirdwall played the leading role in the Swedish TV company SVT's annual children's Christmas “Advent calendar” - Tomtemaskinen (The mechanical santa), one of the Pettson and Findus stories by Sven Nordqvist - with one 15-minute part shown each day until Christmas Eve. Hirdwall played the character of Pettson.

Hirdwall received the Swedish Guldbagge Award for Best Actor at the 17th Guldbagge Awards for Barnens ö (Children's Island) and the Thaliapriset prize in 1993.

Hirdwall is married to the actress Marika Lindström. They have two children, director Jacob Hirdwall and actress Agnes Hirdwall.

Selected filmography

 Min kära är en ros (1963) - Pajen
 Raven's End (1963) - Sixten
 För vänskaps skull (1965) - Jens Mattsson
 The Man on the Roof (1976) - Åke Eriksson
 Hedebyborna (1978, TV Series) - Skomakar-Ludde
 Nattvandraren (1980, TV Movie)
 Children's Island (1980) - Stig Utler
 Jackpot (1980)
 Babels hus (1981, TV Mini-Series) - Bernt Svensson
 Som enda närvarande (1981, TV Short) - Kevin
 Drottning Kristina (1981, TV Mini-Series) - Axel Oxenstierna
 Berget på månens baksida (1983) - Gustaf Edgren
 Midvinterduell (1983, TV Movie) - Egon
 The Man from Majorca (1984) - Fors
 August Strindberg: ett liv (1985, TV Mini-Series) - Läraren / Murveln
 Fläskfarmen (1986, TV Movie) - Monty
 Kunglig toilette (1986, TV Movie) - Restaurateur
 Miraklet i Valby (1989) - Petra's Father
 1939) (1989) - Annika's Father
 Tre kärlekar (1989-1991, TV Series) - Egon Nilsson
 Kejsarn av Portugallien (1992-1993, TV Mini-Series) - Jan
 Tomtemaskinen (1993, TV Series) - Pettson
 Pensionat Oskar (1995) - Strange Man
 Potatishandlaren (1996, TV Movie) - Johansson
 Juloratoriet (1996) - Edman
 Torntuppen (1996, TV Mini-Series) - Johan From
 En kvinnas huvud (1997) - Düber
 Emma åklagare (1997, TV Series) - Ivan Josefsson
 Beck (1997-2020, TV Series) - Grannen
 Den tatuerade änkan (1998, TV Movie) - Egon Andersson
 Ivar Kreuger (1999, TV Mini-Series) - Statsminister Ekman
 Miffo (2003) - Karl Henrik
 Mamma pappa barn (2003) - Roland
 Om jag vänder mig om (2003) - Knut
 Mouth to Mouth (2005) - Mats pappa John
 Möbelhandlarens dotter (2006, TV Mini-Series) - Paul Martinsson d ä
 Offside (2006) - Boston
 Den enskilde medborgaren (2006) - Gunnar Bergström
 Stormen (2009, TV Mini-Series) - Bernt
 The Girl with the Dragon Tattoo (2009) - Dirch Frode
 Miraklet i Viskan (2015) - Halvar

References

External links

1934 births
Living people
Swedish male stage actors
Swedish male film actors
Litteris et Artibus recipients
Male actors from Stockholm
Best Actor Guldbagge Award winners
Best Supporting Actor Guldbagge Award winners